Manuel "Manny" Matos is a retired Portuguese-American football (soccer) midfielder who played professionally in the North American Soccer League and American Soccer League.

A native of Portugal, Matos grew up in New Bedford, MA.  In 1971, he graduated from New Bedford High School. He is a member of the New Haven Athletic Hall of Fame.  He attended West Virginia University where he was a 1973 and 1974 Honorable Mention (third team) All American soccer player. In 1975, he turned professional with the Philadelphia Atoms of the North American Soccer League.  In 1977, Matos returned to New Bedford where he became the High School boys soccer coach.  He would coach the team for twenty-four years and was inducted into the Massachusetts High School Soccer Coaches Association Hall of Fame in 2001.  On May 5, 1978, the New England Tea Men of the North American Soccer League signed Matos.  The Tea Men released Matos on December 23, 1978.  He also played for the Rhode Island Oceaneers of the American Soccer League and for Portuguese Sports of the  Luso American Soccer Association (LASA).

References

External links
 NASL stats
 Philadelphia Atoms player registry

Living people
American soccer coaches
American soccer players
American Soccer League (1933–1983) players
New England Tea Men players
North American Soccer League (1968–1984) players
Philadelphia Atoms players
Rhode Island Oceaneers players
West Virginia Mountaineers men's soccer players
Association football midfielders
Year of birth missing (living people)
Soccer players from Massachusetts
Sportspeople from New Bedford, Massachusetts
Portuguese emigrants to the United States